Vanessa Grenier (born April 15, 1992) is a Canadian former competitive pair skater. With Maxime Deschamps, she placed 8th at the 2016 Four Continents Championships and competed at three Grand Prix events.

Career

Single skating 
Grenier began learning to skate in 1995. She won the silver medal in the junior women's event at the 2008 Canadian Championships and went on to compete at three ISU Junior Grand Prix events. She also appeared at the 2011 World Junior Championships but did not advance past the preliminary round. She was coached by Marie Houde, C. Lemaire, M. Peloquin, M. Grenier, V. Cusson in Drummondville, Quebec.

Grenier competed in the senior women's event at five Canadian Championships, from 2009 to 2013. Her best placement, 7th, came in 2011 and 2012.

Pair skating 
In 2013, Grenier teamed up with Maxime Deschamps to compete in pair skating. The two became the 2014 Canadian junior champions. Making their Grand Prix debut, they placed 6th at the 2014 Skate America. The pair finished 7th at the 2015 Skate Canada International and 8th at the 2016 Four Continents Championships. The pair was coached by Richard Gauthier and Bruno Marcotte in Montreal, Quebec.

Grenier and Deschamps split up in May 2016. Instead of finding a new partner, Grenier announced her retirement on June 12.

Programs

With Deschamps

Ladies' singles

Competitive highlights 
GP: Grand Prix; CS: Challenger Series; JGP: Junior Grand Prix

With Deschamps

Ladies' singles

References

External links
 

1992 births
Canadian female pair skaters
Living people
Sportspeople from Sherbrooke
Canadian female single skaters
21st-century Canadian women